Budlong may refer to:

People
 Charles A. Budlong (1859–1947), American politician
 Clarence R. Budlong (1874–1946), American tennis player
 Frederick G. Budlong (1881–1953), American bishop
 Robert Davol Budlong (1902–1955), American industrial designer
 S. W. Budlong, American politician

Places
 Budlong Creek, New York, United States
 Budlong Farm, Rhode Island, United States

Other
 Budlong Pickle Company, American pickle company